Exile is an American band originally formed in 1963. In the 1970s, they were known as a rock band that had a major hit single with "Kiss You All Over" in 1978. After several lineup changes, the band was re-launched as a country act that achieved additional success in the 1980s and '90s. J.P. Pennington is the only current member of the band remaining from its early days.

Career

Early years 
The origins of Exile were with a high school band in Richmond, Kentucky, called the Ronnie Hall and the Fascinations, which featured vocalist Jimmy Stokley, who at the time was sharing singing duties with Ronnie Hall.
In 1963, the Fascinations merged with another local band, the Digits, and became Jimmy Stokley and the Exiles, with singer/guitarist J.P. Pennington, then age 14, joining a short time later. They toured regionally with the Dick Clark Caravan of Stars in 1965. Their name was later shortened to The Exiles. The band name was apparently based on the wave of Cuban refugees, because at the time, the band were somewhat socially unaccepted, due to their long hair.

After high school, the band moved to Lexington, Kentucky, and recorded several singles for Date Records, Columbia and RCA between 1968 and 1973. In 1973 the name was shortened again to Exile, with Stokley on lead vocals, Pennington on lead guitar, Buzz Cornelison on keyboards, Billy Luxon on trumpet and percussion, Bernie Faulkner on organ, saxophone and rhythm guitar, Kenny Weir on bass, and Bobby Johns on drums. This version of the band released a self-titled album on Wooden Nickel Records in 1973, with a follow-up, "Stage Pass", released in the same year. 

Faulkner, Weir and Luxon would soon depart afterwards. Marlon Hargis would then join on keyboards, in place of Faulkner, and Danny Williams would replace Weir on bass, while Luxon wasn't replaced.
 
The lineup of Stokley, Pennington, Cornelison, Johns, Hargis and Williams would tour regionally for the next few years, before crossing paths with successful songwriter Mike Chapman, who heard an Exile demo. Chapman would get the band on a deal with Atco Records and he, along with his writing partner, Nicky Chinn, would write "Try It On", that Exile recorded and had a minor pop hit with it in 1977. However, when it only reached up to #97 on the "Billboard" Hot 100, Chapman would part ways from the band for a short period, while they were dropped from Atco. The band's drummer, Bobby Johns, would soon depart and join the hard rock band, Roadmaster, and he would be replaced with Steve Goetzman.

Late 1970s pop success 
In 1978, Exile consisted of Stokley, Pennington, and Cornelison, plus second keyboardist Marlon Hargis, bassist Sonny LeMaire, and drummer Steve Goetzman. This lineup signed with Warner Brothers and released the album Mixed Emotions. The disco-influenced single "Kiss You All Over", written by the album's producer Mike Chapman and his songwriting partner Nicky Chinn, topped the American singles chart for four weeks and also reached the top ten in a dozen European countries. The song attracted some controversy for its risqué lyrics, while Stokley gained media attention as a flamboyant and charismatic frontman.

The success of "Kiss You All Over" resulted in invitations for Exile to tour with Heart, Aerosmith, Fleetwood Mac, and other leading rock acts of the period. The follow-up album All There Is yielded the minor hit single "The Part of Me That Needs You Most", which reached the top ten in South Africa and New Zealand in 1979.

Transition to country music 
Jimmy Stokley left the band in 1980 and was replaced by Les Taylor prior to recording sessions for the band's next album, Don't Leave Me this Way. Stokley died at age 41 on August 13, 1985, due to complications from hepatitis, and was later inducted into the Kentucky Music Hall of Fame with a speech by J.P. Pennington. Another longtime member, keyboardist Buzz Cornelison, also departed in the early 1980s. Meanwhile, in 1981, the band released their final album under the Warner Brothers label, Heart and Soul, featuring their original recording of the Chapman/Chinn-penned title track, which would become a big hit for Huey Lewis and the News several years later.  Exile's version was released as a single but failed to crack the Hot 100.

At this point, under the leadership of Pennington, Exile was revamped as a country band with a southern rock flavor. This version of the band signed with Epic Records in 1983 and had a top 40 country single with their first Epic release, "High Cost of Leaving". Some of their songs were covered by other country artists, including Janie Fricke and Alabama, the latter of whom would turn Exile's "The Closer You Get" (from their 1980 album Don't Leave Me This Way) into a #1 Country & Western single in 1983.  Starting in 1983, Exile had three consecutive top ten albums on the Billboard Country Albums chart (Exile, Kentucky Hearts, and Hang On to Your Heart, with the second of those reaching number one), and from 1983 to 1987 ten out of eleven singles reached number one on the Billboard Country Singles chart, making them one of the biggest country artists of the decade. They also received thirteen award nominations from the Academy of Country Music and the Country Music Association.

Pennington and Taylor left the band in 1990. A new lineup featuring singer/guitarist Paul Martin signed with Arista Records and scored some more country hit singles, but they were dropped by Arista after the 1991 album Justice and disbanded in 1993. Twenty-one former members gathered for a farewell concert at the Grand Ole Opry.

Reformation 
After leaving Exile in 1990, J.P. Pennington and Les Taylor both signed solo deals and achieved minor hit singles on the U.S. country charts. Pennington and Taylor performed together on stage in 1995 and decided to resurrect the Exile name. The new version of the band, led by Pennington and Taylor with a shifting cast of sidemen, continued to tour the nostalgia circuit. Since the 1990s the group has released several live albums, plus the new album Wrapped Up in Your Arms for Christmas in 2016.

Discography

Studio albums
 Exile (1973)
 Stage Pass (1978)
 Mixed Emotions (1978)
 All There Is (1979)
 Don't Leave Me This Way / Keeping It Country (1980)
 Heart and Soul (1981)
 Exile (1983)
 Kentucky Hearts (1984)
 Hang On to Your Heart (1985)
 Shelter from the Night (1987)
 Still Standing (1990)
 Justice (1991)
 Wrapped Up In Your Arms for Christmas (2016)

References

Bibliography
 Eve Nicole Lemaire,  Life in Exile: A Journey Home, (2013),  CreateSpace Independent Publishing. 
 Randy Westbrook, 50 Years of Exile (2013), Acclaim Press.

External links
 
 

American country rock groups
American soft rock music groups
Arista Nashville artists
Musical groups established in 1963
Rock music groups from Kentucky
Warner Records artists
1963 establishments in Kentucky
Epic Records artists
Country music groups from Kentucky